Horowhenua College is a state co-educational secondary school located in Levin, New Zealand. It was opened in 1940, replacing the secondary school department of Levin School. It is the oldest college in the Horowhenua area.

History
Horowhenua College has its origins in Levin School, a primary school established in 1890. It was the first school in the Levin area. Levin School incorporated a high school from 1905 until 1939, when it returned to primary only ahead of the opening of Horowhenua College.

Buildings
The main building of the college, known as A Block, is registered as a historic place by Heritage New Zealand.

Notable alumni

 Bob Bell (1929–2011), former National Party MP
 Fraser Colman (1925–2008), former Labour Party MP (1967–1987)
 Darren Hughes (born 1978), former Labour Party MP (2002–2011)
 Codie Taylor (born 1991), current All Black hooker (2014–present)

Notable staff
 Christopher Small (1927–2011), musician and author of influential books and articles on musicology, sociomusicology, and ethnomusicology.

References

External links
School website
Education Review Office (ERO) reports for Horowhenua College

Secondary schools in Manawatū-Whanganui
Levin, New Zealand
Educational institutions established in 1940
1940 establishments in New Zealand